Rezaul Karim Hira (born 1 December 1942) is a Bangladesh Awami League politician who served as the Jatiya Sangsad member representing the Jamalpur-5 constituency during 1996-2018 and is chairman of the Parliamentary Standing Committee on the Ministry of Land. He was the Minister for Land in Sheikh Hasina's cabinet from 2009 to 2013.

References 

1942 births
Living people
People from Jamalpur District
Awami League politicians
7th Jatiya Sangsad members
8th Jatiya Sangsad members
9th Jatiya Sangsad members
10th Jatiya Sangsad members